Gone in the Night may refer to:

 Gone in the Night (1996 film)
 Gone in the Night (2022 film)